Maria Vladimirova Penkova (born 25 June 1984) is a retired professional tennis player from Bulgaria.

Career

Penkova is a former member of the Bulgaria Fed Cup team.

In 2005, Penkova won a European club championship in Rennes, France as a member of the Cherno More Elite team (Bulgarian: Черно море Елит). Her teammates were Virginiya Trifonova, Sesil Karatantcheva and Tsvetana Pironkova.

ITF Circuit finals

Singles: 4 (2 titles, 2 runner–ups)

Doubles: 1 (1 runner–up)

References

External links

1984 births
Living people
Sportspeople from Sofia
Bulgarian female tennis players